Patriarch Joseph V may refer to:

 Joseph Dergham El Khazen, Maronite Patriarch of Antioch in 1733–1742
 Joseph V Augustine Hindi, Patriarch of the Chaldeans for the Chaldean Catholic Church in 1780–1827